Euura collactanea is a species of sawfly belonging to the family Tenthredinidae (common sawflies). The larva feed within galls on the leaves of willows (Salix species). It was first described by Arnold Förster in 1854.

Description of the gall
The gall is found on the underside of a leaf of the host plant. It is globular and up to 5 mm in diameter. Descriptions vary according to the source. According to the Plant Parasites of Europe website, the gall can be hairy and sometimes warty. The colour varies from bright red to a red-tinged green. Redfern et al. (2011) describe the gall as having brown warts and either no hairs or slightly hairy. The galls can be found on the leaves of creeping willow (Salix repens) and rosemary-leaved willow (Salix rosmarinifolia).

Distribution
The gall is found, in the west from Great Britain and Ireland (locally common), north to Sweden and east to Lake Ladoga, Russia.

References

Tenthredinidae
Gall-inducing insects
Hymenoptera of Europe
Insects described in 1854
Taxa named by Arnold Förster
Willow galls